Herbert Charles Angelo Kuchačevič ze Schluderpacheru (11 September 1917 – 27 September 2012), known professionally as Herbert Lom, was a Czech-British actor who moved to the United Kingdom in 1939. In a career lasting more than 60 years, he generally appeared in character roles, often portraying criminals or suave villains in his younger years, and professional men as he aged. Highly versatile, he proved a skilled comic actor in The Pink Panther franchise, as Chief Inspector Dreyfus.

Lom was noted for his precise, elegant enunciation of English. He is best known for his roles in The Ladykillers, The Pink Panther film series,  War and Peace and the television series The Human Jungle.

Early life and education
Lom was born in Prague to Karl Kuchačevič ze Schluderpacheru and Olga Gottlieb. His mother was of Jewish ancestry. His ancestor, Christian Schluderpacher, a burgher of Bozen, was ennobled in 1601. Lom's family were comfortable, but not grandly aristocratic. His grandfather owned property in Prague and Šumava, with his income deriving mainly from two restaurants and a guest house. Lom's father, as a younger son, inherited little, supporting his family by variously running a printing business, a car repair shop, and trying to establish himself as an art agent. The family lived at Žižkov before moving to Vysočany, subsequently lived at Vinohrady, then Nové Město, where Lom attended a famous German grammar school. He studied philosophy for some time at the German University in Prague, but ceased his studies to become an actor.

Career
Lom's film debut was in the Czech film Žena pod křížem ("A Woman Under Cross", 1937) followed by the Boží mlýny ("Mills of God", 1938). His early film appearances were mainly supporting roles, with the occasional top billing. At this time he also changed his surname to Lom ("breakage" or "quarry" in Czech) because it was the shortest he found in a local telephone directory.

Due to the occupation of Czechoslovakia by Nazi Germany, Poland and Hungary in 1938–39, Lom immigrated to Britain in 1939. He made numerous appearances in British films throughout the 1940s, usually in villainous roles, although he later appeared in comedies as well. Despite his mother's Jewish ancestry, Lom's parents survived to join him in England.  

Despite Lom's accent, he managed to escape being typecast as a European heavy by securing a diverse range of casting, including as Napoleon Bonaparte in The Young Mr. Pitt (1942), and again in the King Vidor version of War and Peace (1956). He secured a seven-picture Hollywood contract after World War II, but was unable to obtain an American visa for "political reasons". In a rare starring role, Lom played twin trapeze artists in Dual Alibi (1946). 

Lom starred as the King of Siam in the original London production of Rodgers and Hammerstein's musical The King and I. Opening at the Drury Lane Theatre on 8October 1953, it ran for 926 performances. He can be heard on the cast recording.
A few years later, he appeared opposite Alec Guinness and Peter Sellers in The Ladykillers (1955); and with Robert Mitchum, Jack Lemmon and Rita Hayworth in Fire Down Below (1957). He went on to more film success in the 1960s with a wide range of parts, including Spartacus (1960); El Cid (1961); Mysterious Island (also 1961), as Captain Nemo; and Hammer Films' remake of The Phantom of the Opera (1962), in which Lom had the leading role, wearing a full-face Phantom mask. "It was wonderful to play such a part," he said, "but I was disappointed with the picture... This version of the famous Gaston Leroux story dragged. The Phantom wasn't given enough to do, but at least I wasn't the villain, for a change. Michael Gough was the villain."   

During this period, Lom starred in his only regular TV series, the British drama The Human Jungle (1963–64), playing a Harley Street psychiatrist for two series. He starred in another low-budget horror film, the witch-hunting story Mark of the Devil (Hexen bis aufs Blut gequält, 1970), with unusually graphic torture scenes. Cinemas reportedly handed out sick bags at screenings. Lom appeared in other horror films made in both the US and UK, including Asylum, And Now the Screaming Starts!, Murders in the Rue Morgue and The Dead Zone.

Lom was perhaps best known for his portrayal of Chief Inspector Charles Dreyfus, Inspector Clouseau's long-suffering superior, in most of Blake Edwards' Pink Panther films, beginning with the second in the series, A Shot in the Dark (1964). He also appeared in two screen versions of the Agatha Christie novel And Then There Were None—as Dr. Armstrong in the 1975 version, and as General Romensky in the 1989 version.

Lom wrote two historical novels: one on the playwright Christopher Marlowe (Enter a Spy: The Double Life of Christopher Marlowe, 1978), and the other on the French Revolution (Dr Guillotine: The Eccentric Exploits of an Early Scientist, 1992). The film rights to the latter have been purchased, but no film has yet been produced.

Personal life
Lom married Dina Schea in 1948. They had two children before they divorced after separating between 1961 and 1976. He had a child from a relationship with Brigitta Appleby. He later married Eve Lacik; they divorced in 1990.

Lom died in his sleep at his home in Camden Town, London on 27 September 2012, at the age of 95.

Selected filmography

 Žena pod křížem (1937) as Gustav, Hodan's son
 Boží mlýny (1938) as Chasník
 The Young Mr. Pitt (1942) as Napoleon
 Secret Mission (1942) as Medical Officer
 Tomorrow We Live (1943) as Kurtz
 The Dark Tower (1943) as Stephen Torg
 Hotel Reserve (1944) as Andre Roux
 The Seventh Veil (1945) as Dr. Larsen
 Night Boat to Dublin (1946) as Keitel
 Appointment with Crime (1946) as Gregory Lang
 Dual Alibi (1947) as Jules de Lisle / Georges de Lisle
 Snowbound (1948) as Keramikos
 Good-Time Girl (1948) as Max Vine
 Brass Monkey (1948) as Peter Hobart
 Portrait from Life (1948) as Fritz Kottler Hendlmann
 The Lost People (1949) as Guest (uncredited)
 Golden Salamander (1950) as Rankl
 Night and the City (1950) as Kristo
 State Secret (1950) as Karl Theodor
 The Black Rose (1950) as Anthemus
 Cage of Gold (1950) as Rahman
 Hell Is Sold Out (1951) as Dominic Danges
 Two on the Tiles (1951) as Ford
 Mr. Denning Drives North (1952) as Mados
 Whispering Smith Hits London (1952) as Roger Ford
 The Ringer (1952) as Maurice Meister
 The Man Who Watched Trains Go By (1952) as Julius de Koster, Jr.
 The Net (1953) as Dr. Alex Leon
 Rough Shoot (1953) as Sandorski
 The Love Lottery (1954) as André Amico
 Star of India (1954) as Vicomte de Narbonne
 Beautiful Stranger (1954) as Emile Landosh
 The Ladykillers (1955) as Louis 
 War and Peace (1956) as Napoleon
 Fire Down Below (1957) as Harbour Master
 Hell Drivers (1957) as Gino Rossi
 Action of the Tiger (1957) as Trifon
 Chase a Crooked Shadow (1958) as Police Commissar Vargas
 I Accuse! (1958) as Major du Paty de Clam
 Intent to Kill (1958) as Juan Menda
 The Roots of Heaven (1958) as Orsini
 Passport to Shame (1958) as Nick Biaggi
 No Trees in the Street (1959) as Wilkie
 The Big Fisherman (1959) as Herod Antipas
 North West Frontier (US: Flame Over India, 1959) as Peter van Leyden
 Third Man on the Mountain (1959) as Emil Saxo
 I Aim at the Stars (1960) as Anton Reger
 Spartacus (1960) as Tigranes Levantus (pirate envoy)
 Mr. Topaze (1961) as Castel Benac
 Mysterious Island (1961) as Captain Nemo
 The Frightened City (1961) as Waldo Zhernikov
 El Cid (1961) as Ben Yusuf
 The Phantom of the Opera (1962) as The Phantom
 Tiara Tahiti (1962) as Chong Sing
 Treasure of the Silver Lake (1962) as Colonel Brinkley
  (1963, TV film) as Schiapa
 The Human Jungle (1963–1964, TV series, 26 episodes) as Dr. Roger Corder
 A Shot in the Dark (1964) as Police Commissioner Charles Dreyfus
 Uncle Tom's Cabin (1965) as Simon Legree
 Return from the Ashes (1965) as Dr. Charles Bovard
 Our Man in Marrakesh (1966) as Mr. Casimir
 Gambit (1966) as Ahmad Shahbandar
 The Karate Killers (1967) as Randolph
 Die Nibelungen: Kriemhild's Revenge (1967) as King Etzel (Attila)
 Villa Rides (1968) as General Huerta
 Eve (1968) as Diego
 Assignment to Kill (1968) as Matt Wilson
 99 Women (1969) as Governor Santos
 Doppelgänger (1969) as Dr Kurt Hassler
 Mark of the Devil (1970) as Lord Cumberland
 Mister Jerico (1970, TV film) as Rosso
 Count Dracula (1970) as Van Helsing
 Dorian Gray (1970) as Henry Wotton
 Murders in the Rue Morgue (1971) as René Marot
 Hawaii Five-O ("Highest Castle, Deepest Grave", 1971, TV) as Mondrago
 Asylum (1972) as Dr. Byron (segment: "Mannikins of Horror")
 Dark Places (1972) as Prescott
 And Now the Screaming Starts! (1973) as Sir Henry Fengriffin
 And Then There Were None (1974) as Dr. Edward Armstrong
 The Return of the Pink Panther (1975) as Chief Inspector Charles Dreyfus
 The Pink Panther Strikes Again (1976) as Former Chief Inspector Charles Dreyfus
 Charleston (1977) as Inspector Watkins
 Revenge of the Pink Panther (1978) as Chief Inspector Charles Dreyfus
 The Lady Vanishes (1979) as Dr. Hartz
 The Man with Bogart's Face (1980) as Mr. Zebra
 Hopscotch (1980) as Yaskov
 Peter and Paul (1981) as Barnabas
 Trail of the Pink Panther (1982) as Chief Inspector Charles Dreyfus
 Curse of the Pink Panther (1983) as Chief Inspector Charles Dreyfus
 The Dead Zone (1983) as Dr. Sam Weizak
 Lace (1984, TV miniseries) as Monsieur Chardin
 Memed, My Hawk (1984) as Ali Safa Bey
 King Solomon's Mines (1985) as Colonel Bockner
 Scoop (TV film, 1987) as Mr. Baldwin
 Master of Dragonard Hill (1987) as Le Farge
 Going Bananas (1987) as Captain Mackintosh
 Skeleton Coast (1988) as Elia
 Whoops Apocalypse (1988) as General Mosquera
 River of Death (1989) as Colonel Ricardo Diaz
 Masque of the Red Death (1989) as Ludwig
 Ten Little Indians (1989) as General Romensky
 The Devil's Daughter (1991) as Moebius Kelly
 The Pope Must Die (US: The Pope Must Diet!, 1991) as Vittorio Corelli
 Son of the Pink Panther (1993) as Police Commissioner Charles Dreyfus
 Agatha Christie's Marple, episode "Murder at the Vicarage" (2002), as Augustin Dufosse (final role)

Voice work
"Nemesis" (2007) in Agatha Christie's Marple series, as Jason Rafiel (voice, uncredited)

References

External links

 
 
 
 
 "Herbert Lom: The Odd Fellow"
 Photographs and Literature related to Lom

1917 births
2012 deaths
20th-century British male writers
20th-century British novelists
British male comedy actors
British male film actors
British male novelists
British male television actors
British male writers
British people of Czech-Jewish descent
Czech emigrants to the United Kingdom
Czech male film actors
Czech male television actors
Czech male writers
Czech novelists
Czech people of Jewish descent
Czechoslovak emigrants to the United Kingdom
Male actors from Prague
Naturalised citizens of the United Kingdom